Denner is a discount supermarket chain in Switzerland. It is Switzerland's third-largest supermarket chain after Migros and Coop with 11.4% market share. It is owned by the Federation of Migros Cooperatives since 2007.

As of 2022, Denner has 860 stores (591 own stores and 269 running as franchise called Denner Partner) and a revenue of 3.7 billion CHF. Denner is the second largest wine-seller in Switzerland.

History 

It was started in 1860 and later developed by Karl Schweri. It later made Switzerland's first discounter in 1967 in Zurich. In 1973, it broke the country's tobacco cartel. In 2004, the sales of its 580 outlets exceeded CHF 1.8 billion.

In 2005 Denner acquired its rival discount chain Pick Pay.

In January 2007, it was announced that Migros has purchased a majority stake in Denner. After the entrance of the worldwide-known retailers Aldi and Lidl (2004 and 2009), Denner successfully defended its leading role in the discount category.

"One for all" ("Einer für Alle") is the company claim, as it describes itself as the "Retail's Robin Hood", who is fighting for cheaper prices for the customers.

At the end of 2016, the leading Swiss discounter Denner had 510 of its own discounter branches in all four language regions of Switzerland and in the Principality of Liechtenstein, as well as independent retailers who are supplied by the company Denner and operate under the names Denner Satellit and "Denner Partner" (279 branches). 20 locations are also operated in the franchise model as Denner Express or Denner partners. At the end of 2017, Denner had 811 points of sale. With over 300 wines in its range, Denner is the second-largest wine retailer in Switzerland after Coop. At the end of 2018, Denner employed a total of 5,075 people and 105 apprentices. Net sales in 2016 were 2.97 billion Swiss francs and 138.3 million purchases were registered. At the end of 2018, Denner had 817 branches.

References

External links

 Denner Market - All Things Denner 

Supermarkets of Switzerland
Retail companies established in 1860
No frills